Moolgaokar is an Indian surname. Notable people with the surname include:

 Sumant Moolgaokar (1906–1989), Indian industrialist
 Leela Sumant Moolgaokar (1916–1992), Indian social worker

Surnames of Indian origin
Indian surnames